Cochylimorpha brandti is a species of moth of the family Tortricidae. It is found in Iran (Khorasan, Mashhad: the Binalud Mountains and the Elburz Mountains).

References

 

B
Moths of Asia
Insects of Iran
Moths described in 1963